Erik Lindberg (31 December 1873 – 28 September 1966) was a Swedish sculptor and engraver. He was best known for designing the Nobel Prize medals.

Biography
Johan Erik Lindberg was born in Stockholm, Sweden. He was the son of Adolph Lindberg (1839-1916) and his wife Hildegard Charlotta Grundström (1843-1923). His father was  a noted sculptor and professor at the Royal Swedish Academy of Fine Arts (Kungliga Akademien för de fria konsterna) in Stockholm. 

He trained at his father's studio from 1892 to 1899. He also attended the Royal Swedish Academy from 1893 until 1897 when he graduated. He  obtained a scholarship which enabled him to spend some years in Paris from around 1901 to 1902. He also conducted a study trip to Italy in 1901. He was influenced by modern French medal engravers of that period including Louis-Oscar Roty (1846–1911), Jules-Clément Chaplain (1839-1909), Ernest Paulin Tasset (1839-1921) and Frédéric-Charles-Victor de Vernon (1858-1912). 

In 1901 Lindberg was given the task of creating the  medal for the Nobel Prizes in the fields of Physics, Chemistry, Physiology or Medicine and Literature. The medal for the Nobel Peace Prize was created by Norwegian sculptor  Gustav Vigeland (1869-1943). According to correspondence between Lindberg and his father, the designs were not quite ready for the first ceremony in 1901; the reverse sides of the medals required approval from the Prize-Giving association, and so the winners were given temporary medals. In November 1901, after lengthy discussions by letter, Lindberg returned to Stockholm to present his ideas in person. However, it wasn't until September the following year the designs were ready and the first winners received their proper prize. 

In 1912, he designed medals for the 1912 Summer Olympics in  Stockholm.
In 1915 he received a gold medal at the Panama-Pacific International Exhibition.
He was  engaged as an engraver at the Royal Mint (Kungliga Myntet) from 1916 until he retired in 1944. He was a professor at the Royal Swedish Academy from 1930.
Many of his works are on display in the collection of the  Nationalmuseum in  Stockholm .

Personal life
In 1902, he married Johanna Dagmar Maria Treffenberg (1875-1960). They were the parents of Folke Adolf Lindberg (born 1903) and Sven Folke Lindberg (born 1904). Johan Erik Lindberg died in Stockholm during 1966.

References

Other  Sources 

1873 births
1966 deaths
19th-century engravers
20th-century engravers
Swedish male sculptors
Swedish engravers
Artists from Stockholm
20th-century sculptors
19th-century sculptors
Recipients of the Prince Eugen Medal
Date of birth missing
Place of death missing